Nuno Alexandre Tavares Mendes (born 19 June 2002) is a Portuguese professional footballer who plays as a left-back for Ligue 1 club Paris Saint-Germain and the Portugal national team.

Coming through Sporting CP's youth academy, he made his first-team debut in 2020, and in the following year, he won a double of the Primeira Liga and Taça da Liga, while being named in the Primeira Liga Team of the Year. In August 2021, he moved to Paris Saint-Germain on a one-year loan deal, winning the Ligue 1 title and joining the club permanently for €38 million.

Mendes is a former Portugal youth international, representing his country at various levels. He made his full debut in 2021, and was chosen in the squads for Euro 2020 and the 2022 World Cup.

Club career

Early career
Born in Sintra, Lisbon District of Angolan descent, Mendes started playing football aged 9, and his idols growing up were Cristiano Ronaldo, Lionel Messi, David Alaba and Marcelo, the two last players being the ones he tried to emulate. He would be spotted by his school teacher Bruno Botelho, who invited him to play for local club Despertar on the outskirts of Lisbon. He quickly stood out, subsequently catching the eye of Benfica, Porto and Sporting CP and joining the latter's youth system at the age of 10.

During his scouting process, as he returned home from school, Mendes realised he was being followed by a man. For fear of being robbed, he ran home, located in a very poor neighbourhood; the "stalker" was actually a Sporting scout, who later convinced him to sign. He spent the next four years making a two-hour round trip in order to train every night with his teacher, before moving to Sporting's academy at the age of 14.

Mendes initially played as an attacking midfielder before being converted to a left-back, a position he struggled with in the beginning.

Sporting CP
Following the outbreak of the COVID-19 pandemic in February, which brought a premature end to the youth football season, Mendes was one of a small group of youth players to be called up to the first team by manager Rúben Amorim, despite having only played once since November due to an injury. He made his professional debut in a 1–0 Primeira Liga home win against Paços de Ferreira on 12 June 2020, as a 72nd-minute substitute for Marcos Acuña.

After the latter left for Sevilla in the 2020 off-season, Mendes became first choice at only 18, becoming the youngest player to make the club's starting XI since Cristiano Ronaldo in September 2002; he went onto start six of his side's seven remaining league matches. He scored his first competitive goal for them on 4 October of the same year, in the 2–0 away victory over Portimonense.

Mendes agreed to a contract extension on 19 December 2020, increasing his buyout clause from €45 million to €70 million. He played 29 games for the eventual champions, while also being named in the Team of the Year.

On 31 July 2021, Mendes provided an assist for Jovane Cabral in the 2–1 defeat of Braga and conquest of the Supertaça Cândido de Oliveira.

Paris Saint-Germain
On 31 August 2021, Mendes joined Paris Saint-Germain on a season-long loan with an option to buy. He made his Ligue 1 debut for the club on 11 September, coming on as a 85th-minute substitute in a 4–0 defeat of Clermont. He appeared in his first game in the UEFA Champions League four days later, replacing Abdou Diallo 75 minutes into a 1–1 draw away to Club Brugge in the group stage; he had an instant impact on the pitch, notably making a "brilliant" run to set up a shooting opportunity for Lionel Messi at the 77th minute. He made his first start later that month, in a 2–1 win over Lyon.

Mendes helped PSG win their record-tying 10th national championship by making 27 appearances (18 starts), and later was nominated to the Young Player of the Year and named to the Team of the Year alongside two of his teammates. On 31 May 2022, his buyout clause of €38 million was triggered and he signed a permanent four-year contract.

Mendes scored his first official goal on 3 September 2022, closing a 3–0 away victory against Nantes. His first in the Champions League came on 2 November, the 2–1 winner at Juventus in the last group fixture.

International career
Mendes earned his first cap for Portugal at under-21 level shortly after having made his club debut, in a 4–0 win in Cyprus for the 2021 UEFA European Championship qualifiers on 4 September 2020. Previously, he represented the nation's under-16, under-17, under-18 and under-19s.

Six months later, Mendes was called up to the senior team by manager Fernando Santos for 2022 FIFA World Cup qualifying matches against Azerbaijan, Luxembourg and Serbia, and subsequently removed from the under-21 squad due to appear in the finals. He first appeared with the former on 24 March 2021, playing the entire 1–0 victory against Azerbaijan.

Mendes was selected for UEFA Euro 2020, playing no games in a round-of-16 exit. Santos later revealed that he had planned to use him alongside Raphaël Guerreiro during the tournament, but could not do so due to injury problems.

In November 2022, Mendes was named in the final squad for the World Cup in Qatar. After a first-half thigh injury in the second group-stage match against Uruguay, he missed the rest of the competition.

Style of play
Known mainly for his offensive capabilities, speed, and technical qualities, Mendes plays mainly as a left-sided attacking full-back or wing-back, which allows him to create danger either from a standing start or whilst on the counter-attack. Apart from his dribbling, he boasts an excellent crossing ability whether tightly marked or open in space, and his physical prowess allows him to beat out opponents to the ball either with his speed or strength. He is also capable of anticipating attacks and cutting in front of a pass and winning the ball back.

Despite his ability going forward, however, the defensive side of Mendes's game has been brought into question by pundits on occasion, who have cited the inconsistency on his decision-making in front of goal, positioning and awareness as areas of weakness in need of improvement.

Career statistics

Club

International

Honours
Sporting CP
Primeira Liga: 2020–21
Taça da Liga: 2020–21
Supertaça Cândido de Oliveira: 2021

Paris Saint-Germain
Ligue 1: 2021–22
Trophée des Champions: 2022

Individual
Primeira Liga Team of the Year: 2020–21
IFFHS Men's Youth (U20) World Team: 2021
Union Nationale des Footballeurs Professionels Ligue 1 Team of the Year: 2021–22

References

External links

2002 births
Living people
People from Sintra
Portuguese sportspeople of Angolan descent
Sportspeople from Lisbon District
Black Portuguese sportspeople
Portuguese footballers
Association football defenders
Primeira Liga players
Sporting CP footballers
Ligue 1 players
Paris Saint-Germain F.C. players
Portugal youth international footballers
Portugal under-21 international footballers
Portugal international footballers
UEFA Euro 2020 players
2022 FIFA World Cup players
Portuguese expatriate footballers
Expatriate footballers in France
Portuguese expatriate sportspeople in France